David da Costa (born 19 April 1986)  is a Swiss footballer who plays for FC Thalwil in the fourth-tier Swiss 1. Liga, as a goalkeeper.

Club career
Costa was signed by Italian Serie B club Novara Calcio on 4 June 2015.

References

External links 

 Stats at Swiss Football league site

1986 births
Footballers from Zürich
Swiss people of Portuguese descent
Living people
Swiss men's footballers
Association football goalkeepers
FC Chiasso players
FC Concordia Basel players
FC Wohlen players
FC Thun players
FC Zürich players
Novara F.C. players
FC Lugano players
FC Schaffhausen players
Swiss Super League players
Swiss Challenge League players
Serie B players
Swiss 1. Liga (football) players
Swiss expatriate footballers
Expatriate footballers in Italy
Swiss expatriate sportspeople in Italy